Tur Laha  is a Syrian village located in Qurqania Nahiyah in Harem District, Idlib. According to the Syria Central Bureau of Statistics (CBS), Tur Laha had a population of 177 in the 2004 census.

References 

Populated places in Harem District